Pierre Renald Plante (born May 14, 1951) is a Canadian former professional ice hockey player who played 599 National Hockey League (NHL) games for the Philadelphia Flyers, St. Louis Blues, Chicago Black Hawks, New York Rangers and Quebec Nordiques. He featured in the 1979 Stanley Cup Finals with the Rangers.

Plante had a reputation as a durable, flashy winger who rarely missed a game through injury. He spent a majority of his professional career with St. Louis. Plante was born in Valleyfield, Quebec.

Career statistics

External links

 

1951 births
Living people
Canadian ice hockey right wingers
Chicago Blackhawks players
Drummondville Rangers players
French Quebecers
Ice hockey people from Quebec
National Hockey League first-round draft picks
New York Rangers players
Philadelphia Flyers draft picks
Philadelphia Flyers players
Quebec Nordiques players
Richmond Robins players
Sportspeople from Salaberry-de-Valleyfield
St. Louis Blues players
Syracuse Firebirds players